Young Jesse James is a 1960 American Western film directed by William F. Claxton and written by Orville H. Hampton and Jerry Sackheim. The film stars Ray Stricklyn, Willard Parker, Merry Anders, Robert Dix, Emile Meyer and Jacklyn O'Donnell. The film was released on August 2, 1960, by 20th Century Fox.

Plot

Cast 
Ray Stricklyn as Jesse James
Willard Parker as Cole Younger
Merry Anders as Belle Starr
Robert Dix as Frank James
Emile Meyer as Maj. Charlie Quantrill
Jacklyn O'Donnell as Zerelda 'Zee' Mimms
Rayford Barnes as Pitts
Rex Holman as Zack
Boyd Holister as Bob Younger
Sheila Bromley as Mrs. Samuels
John O'Neill as Jim Younger
Leslie Bradley as Major Clark
Norman Leavitt as Folsom
Lee Kendall as Jennison
Tyler McVey as Banker
Britt Lomond as Yankee Officer
Ollie O'Toole as Banker
Howard Wright as Storekeeper Jenkins

References

External links 
 

1960 films
1960s English-language films
20th Century Fox films
CinemaScope films
American adventure films
1960 adventure films
Films directed by William F. Claxton
1960s American films